The Baihe Taiwan Film and TV Town was a theme park in Baihe District, Tainan, Taiwan. The park ceased operations in 2017.

See also
 List of tourist attractions in Taiwan

References

External links
 

Year of establishment missing
Amusement parks in Taiwan
Tourist attractions in Tainan
Buildings and structures in Tainan